The Daltons' Women is a 1950 American Western film directed by Thomas Carr starring Lash LaRue and Al "Fuzzy" St. John. It was the seventh of LaRue's films for Ron Ormond's Western Adventures Productions Inc.

The film was the first to be released by Howco, Ron Ormond's new film company composed of Ormond and drive-in movie owners Joy N. Houck and J. Francis White, and director Thomas Carr's first film in the Lash LaRue series. The film features appearances by several well known stars such as Jack Holt, Tom Tyler and Tom Neal and a lengthier running time of 77 minutes featuring a multitude of musical numbers, juggling, and a lengthy catfight. Though the Women of the title have little to do with the narrative of the film, "the frontier's first dance hall belles" were played up in the publicity with the original film trailer giving Lash LaRue last billing. The film was shot at the Iverson Movie Ranch.

Plot
US Marshal Lash and Deputy Marshal Fuzzy work undercover together with a female Pinkerton detective to end the Dalton Brothers working with a corrupt mayor and sheriff.

Criticism

Cast
Lash La Rue 	... 	Marshal Lash La Rue
Al St. John ... Deputy Fuzzy Q. Jones
Jack Holt 	... 	Clint Dalton/Mike Leonard
 Tom Neal  ... Mayor
Pamela Blake 	... 	Joan Talbot
 Jacqueline Fontaine 	... 	Jacqueline Fontaine
Raymond Hatton 	... 	Sheriff Doolin
Lyle Talbot 	... 	Jim Thorne
Tom Tyler 	... 	Emmett Dalton
J. Farrell MacDonald 	... 	Alvin - Stage Company Representative
	Terry Frost 	... 	Jess Dalton/Billy Saunders
Archie R. Twitchell  ... Honest Hank
Stanley Price 	... 	Manson
Bud Osborne 	... 	Adams the Stage Driver
 Cliff Taylor 	... 	George the Bartender 
 June Benbow 	... 	May 
 Henry "Duke" Johnson 	... 	The Juggler

References

External links

1950 films
American Western (genre) films
1950 Western (genre) films
American black-and-white films
1950s English-language films
1950s American films